Molly was launched in the Thirteen Colonies in 1759, probably under the same name. From 1776 on she was a whaler, sailing to the northern whale fishery from Kingston-on-Hull. She made annual whaling voyages until 1806 when a French frigate captured her.

Career
Molly first appeared in an online copy of Lloyd's Register in 1776. Although there is no readily accessible data on her career before 1775, apparently she had made 32 annual whaling voyages prior to her capture in 1806, which suggests that she had been whaling since 1774. She made the sixth most whaling voyages of any northern whale fishery whaler.

The whaling season lasted from March to July-August, or so. Favourable conditions could result in short seasons; in 1799 Molly sailed to Greenland on 17 March and returned to Hull 87 days later, on 12 June, with a good catch. When not whaling, the vessels would frequently engage in the coal or Baltic trades, though with a crew a third of the size of that they required for whaling.

Captain Potts remained Mollys master until 1786.

In 1787 Molly was in Greenland when she took an extremely large whale.

That same year  gathered one whale. However, Molly claimed it. The matter went to court and on 30 November 1787 the judge found for the plaintiff. The judge awarded Molly £478.

Fate
Lloyd's List reported in July 1806 that the frigate had captured the whalers Lion, of Liverpool, and Molly, of Hull. In August Lloyd's List reported that a French frigate had taken Molly, Sadler.

Notes

Citations

References
 
 
 
 
 

1759 ships
Age of Sail merchant ships of England
Whaling ships
Captured ships